Derek Famulare (born December 22, 1989) is a Canadian professional ice hockey player. He most recently played for Laval Prédateurs of the LNAH. He previously played for HC TPS of the Liiga. Famulare was born to a Finnish mother and a Canadian father, and also holds a Finnish citizenship.

Famulare played junior hockey for the Chicoutimi Saguenéens, Val-d'Or Foreurs, Acadie-Bathurst Titan and Prince Edward Island Rocket from 2006 until 2010. Famulare attended Concordia University for one year, then turned professional in Europe with TUTO Hockey of the Mestis league in Finland. Famulare made his Liiga debut playing with HC TPS during the 2013–14 Liiga season. He returned to Canada to join the Cornwall River Kings of the LNAH in 2014. He signed with the Laval Prédateurs in 2015, but only played one game.

References

External links

1989 births
Living people
Acadie–Bathurst Titan players
Canadian ice hockey forwards
Chicoutimi Saguenéens (QMJHL) players
HC TPS players
Val-d'Or Foreurs players
P.E.I. Rocket players
Ice hockey people from Montreal
Canadian people of Finnish descent
Canadian expatriate ice hockey players in Finland
Finnish people of Canadian descent